Xylocopa africana is a species of carpenter bee.

Subspecies
X. a. africana (Fabricius, 1781)
X. a. congoensis Enderlein, 1903 
X. a. conradti Enderlein, 1903 
X. a. longjinensis Strand, 1911

Description
In males, the thorax and the first abdominal segment are golden yellow, while in females they are brown. The abdomen is mainly dark brown or blackish.

Distribution
This species can be found in Senegal, Gambia, Sierra Leone, Liberia, Togo, Nigeria, Cameroon, Republic of the Congo, the Democratic Republic of the Congo, Equatorial Guinea, Gabon, Uganda and Angola.

References 

Eardley, C. D. (1987) Catalogue of Apoidea (Hymenoptera) in Africa south of the Sahara, Part 1, The genus Xylocopa Latreille (Anthophoridae), Entomology Memoir, No. 70

africana
Hymenoptera of Africa
Insects of Angola
Insects of Cameroon
Insects of Equatorial Guinea
Insects of Gabon
Insects of West Africa
Insects of the Democratic Republic of the Congo
Insects of the Republic of the Congo
Insects described in 1781